The Pickerel River is a river in the Canadian province of Ontario. Essentially a secondary arm of the larger French River system, the river extends from its headwaters in the Loring and Restoule area of the Almaguin Highlands in the northern part of Parry Sound District to Georgian Bay. Smaller channels near Wanikewin and Hartley Bay also connect the river directly to the main watercourse of the French River.

The river is crossed by the Canadian National Railway's Bala Subdivision, the Canadian Pacific Railway's Parry Sound Subdivision, and the Trans-Canada Highway (as Ontario Highway 69).

References

Rivers of Sudbury District
Rivers of Parry Sound District
Tributaries of Georgian Bay